Independence Avenue (Praspiekt Niezaliežnasci) is the main street of Minsk, the capital of Belarus. Independence Avenue crosses Minsk radially from its centre towards the North-East.

Notable landmarks 
Key landmarks located from West to East:

Independence Square
The House of Government
Minsk City Hall
Church of Saints Simon and Helena
Belarusian State University
KGB Headquarters
October Square
Palace of the Republic
Museum of the Great Patriotic War 
Belarus State Circus
Central House of Officers
Trade Unions Palace of Culture
Aleksander Garden Square
Yanka Kupala Park
Gorky Park
Victory Square
Church of Holy Trinity
Yakub Kolas Square
Kalinin Square
Central Botanical Garden of the National Academy of Sciences of Belarus
Čaliuskincaŭ Park
National Library of Belarus.

World Heritage status 
Architectural ensemble of Francysk Scaryna avenue in Minsk (1940s-1950s) is in the UNESCO World Heritage Tentative List (Cultural property).

Interesting facts 

 Independence avenue crosses five different squares on its path: Kalinin Square, Yakub Kolas Square, Victory Square, October Square and Independence Square.
The avenue's name was changed 14 times.

References

External links 

Buildings and structures in Minsk
Streets in Minsk